The 2011 European Junior Badminton Championships were held at the Vantaan Energia Arena in Vantaa, Finland, between 15-24 April 2011.

Medalists

Medal table

References

European Junior Badminton Championships
European Junior Badminton Championships
European Junior Badminton Championships
European Junior Badminton Championships
International sports competitions hosted by Finland